The Morgan Bridge is a historic structure, originally located southeast of Old Peru, Iowa, United States. The wrought iron or steel Pratt pony truss was manufactured by the King Iron Bridge & Manufacturing Company of Cleveland. Benton Jones of Winterset, Iowa assembled it for $376.39. The approaches are timber stringer spans, and it is supported by timber pile bents. The bridge has not been operational for years. It was listed on the National Register of Historic Places in 1998. The span originally served a remote crossing, but has subsequently been relocated and is now owned by the Madison County Historical Society.

References

Bridges completed in 1891
Bridges in Madison County, Iowa
National Register of Historic Places in Madison County, Iowa
Road bridges on the National Register of Historic Places in Iowa
Truss bridges in Iowa
Steel bridges in the United States
Pratt truss bridges in the United States